Edward Edgar "Anzac" Fisher (11 July 1887 – 24 January 1954) was  a former Australian rules footballer who played with St Kilda and Richmond in the Victorian Football League (VFL).
Fisher was a strong, courageous ruck-rover who came to the Tigers as a result of serving with several Richmond players during the First World War. Fisher was in the A.I.F. for the duration of World War One, firstly at Gallipoli and then in France, hence his nickname "Anzac".

Family
The son of John Hunter Fisher, and Agnes Fisher, née Parker, Edward Edgar Fisher was born at Richmond, Victoria on 11 July 1887.

He married Agnes Pauline Plunkett (1889-) in 1911; they were divorced in 1924.

Military service
He served in the First AIF. He was awarded the Meritorious Service Medal (MSM) on 17 June 1918.

Death
He died at Redfern, New South Wales on 24 January 1954.

Notes

References
 Hogan P: The Tigers Of Old, Richmond FC, (Melbourne), 1996. 
 Holmesby, Russell & Main, Jim (2014). The Encyclopedia of AFL Footballers: every AFL/VFL player since 1897 (10th ed.). Seaford, Victoria: BAS Publishing. .
 First World War Embarkation Roll: Private Edward Edgar Fisher (981), collection of the Australian War Memorial.
 War One Service Record: WO2 Edward Edgar Fisher (981), National Archives of Australia.
 First World War Nominal Roll: WO2 Edward Edgar Fisher (981), collection of the Australian War Memorial.

External links 
		

1887 births
1954 deaths
Australian rules footballers from Victoria (Australia)
St Kilda Football Club players
Richmond Football Club players